The Bishan Bus Interchange is a bus interchange serving Bishan, Singapore. The interchange commenced passenger service as Bishan Bus Terminal in 1988, with Services 56 and 58. Located at Bishan Street 13, it is designed in a unique squarish configuration with the building wrapping around the bus parking area. 

The Ministry of Education Language Centre (MOELC) lies across the field to the north. Passengers also able to transfer to the Circle line from an entrance located right outside the interchange.

History
Bishan Bus Interchange opened on 30 April 1989. Built at a cost of SGD$5.5 million, it replaced the temporary bus station that had been serving the new town of Bishan since December 1985. It was among the first batch of bus interchanges built to integrate with a Mass Rapid Transit (MRT) station. As such, passengers can easily transfer between bus services at this interchange and the Bishan MRT station.

Design
The unusual design of Bishan Bus Interchange was even described in The New Paper as "a piece of Disneyland in Bishan". The interchange features a castle-like structure wrapping around the bus parking area. Above the interchange, there is a cafeteria as well as a car park. A children's playground and an adjoining structure that houses a coffee shop (taken over a McDonald’s branch) was also constructed together with this interchange. 

Bishan Bus Interchange is physically linked to the neighbouring Junction 8 and to Bishan MRT station.

Facilities
Bishan bus interchange used to feature a fast food restaurant, being the first bus interchange in Singapore to have this facility. It also features a children's playground, which was designed to complement the fast food restaurant to make the bus interchange family-friendly.

The bus interchange also houses a 560-lot car park above its premises.

Bus Contracting Model

Under the new bus contracting model, all the bus routes were split into 3 route packages: 50, 52, 54, 56 and 410 under Bishan-Toa Payoh, 57 under Bukit Merah and 53, 55, 58 and 59 under Serangoon-Eunos Bus Packages.

References

External links
 
 Interchanges and Terminals (SBS Transit)

Buildings and structures in Bishan, Singapore
Bus stations in Singapore
Transport in Central Region, Singapore